Clairemont may refer to:

Clairemont, San Diego, California
Clairemont, Texas
Clairemont Elementary, a school in Decatur, Georgia
Clairemont High School, San Diego
Clairemont Avenue, a portion of U.S. Route 12 in Eau Claire, Wisconsin

See also
Clairmont (disambiguation)
Claremont (disambiguation)
Claremont Hotel (disambiguation)
Clermont (disambiguation)